Jonathan Hughes (17 March 1721 – 25 November 1805) was a Welsh poet.

He was born at Pengwern near Llangollen.  His work was mainly in the cynghanedd form, and was intended to be sung.  He wrote for popular periodicals and is mentioned prominently among the competitors at many 18th century eisteddfodau.

Works
Y Dywysoges Genefetha (1744)
Bardd a Byrddau (1778)

His son and namesake (1753–1834) and his grandson, also of the same name (1797–1860), were also poets.

Further reading
Bardd Pengwern - Detholiad o Gerddi Jonathan Hughes, Llangollen (1721–1805, Siwan M. Rosser (June 2007)

Sources
Welsh Biography Online

1721 births
1805 deaths
Welsh-language poets